The Taipei Mosque may refer to:

 Taipei Grand Mosque in Da'an District, Taipei, Taiwan
 Taipei Cultural Mosque in Zhongzheng District, Taipei, Taiwan